Elder Sign may refer to:
 Elder Sign (Cthulhu Mythos), a fictional element in the Cthulhu Mythos by H. P. Lovecraft
 Elder Sign (card game), a cooperative card and dice game published by Fantasy Flight Games
 Elder Sign: Omens, a 2011 video game developed by Fantasy Flight Games

See also
 Elder Signs Press, a Michigan-based book publisher